Alathur is a village in the Kudavasal taluk of Tiruvarur district, Tamil Nadu, India.

Demographics 

As per the 2001 census, Alathur  had a total population of 1785 with 918 males and 872 females. The sex ratio was 955. The literacy rate was 79.58.

References 

 

Villages in Tiruvarur district
Villages in Kudavasal Taluk